In Greek mythology, Heleus or Heleius (Ancient Greek: Ἕλειος), also Helius (Ἕλιος), was a Mycenaean prince.

Family 
Heleus was one of the sons of Perseus and Andromeda. He was the brother of Perses, Alcaeus, Sthenelus, Electryon, Mestor, Cynurus, Gorgophone and Autochthe.

Mythology 
Heleus accompanied his nephew Amphitryon, son of Alcaeus, on the expedition to Taphos, and after the victory shared the sovereignty of their domain with Cephalus.

The town Helos in Laconia was said to have been founded by and named after him.

Notes

References 
Perseid dynasty

 Apollodorus, The Library with an English Translation by Sir James George Frazer, F.B.A., F.R.S. in 2 Volumes, Cambridge, MA, Harvard University Press; London, William Heinemann Ltd. 1921. ISBN 0-674-99135-4. Online version at the Perseus Digital Library. Greek text available from the same website.
 Pausanias, Description of Greece with an English Translation by W.H.S. Jones, Litt.D., and H.A. Ormerod, M.A., in 4 Volumes. Cambridge, MA, Harvard University Press; London, William Heinemann Ltd. 1918. . Online version at the Perseus Digital Library
 Pausanias, Graeciae Descriptio. 3 vols. Leipzig, Teubner. 1903.  Greek text available at the Perseus Digital Library.
 Strabo, The Geography of Strabo. Edition by H.L. Jones. Cambridge, Mass.: Harvard University Press; London: William Heinemann, Ltd. 1924. Online version at the Perseus Digital Library.
 Strabo, Geographica edited by A. Meineke. Leipzig: Teubner. 1877. Greek text available at the Perseus Digital Library.

Princes in Greek mythology
Laconian characters in Greek mythology
Laconian mythology